Kirkcaldy railway station is a railway station in the town of Kirkcaldy, Fife, Scotland. British Transport Police maintain a small office on Platform 1.

The station is located on Station Road, with an entrance on Whyte Melville Road. There are car parks on either side with an extension on the Whyte Melville Road side for Edinburgh commuter traffic. The station building is situated on the Edinburgh platform. In the building is a ticket office (at street level), toilets, public phone, photo booth and shop.

Platforms are adjoined by a connecting subway and a flight of stairs. Two lifts have recently been installed for north and south platform access.

There are waiting rooms on both platforms and CCTV is in operation.  Train running information is provided via CIS displays, automatic announcements and customer help points.

There are three main railway station bus stops located on Bennochy Road (off Station Road) with access to the car park. A further two bus stops are located on Whyte Melville Road, one of which is adjacent to the entrance and the other opposite University of Dundee Nursing Kirkcaldy Campus.

History 

A proposal to bring two railway lines to the town had been suggested as far back as 1836, but neither plan succeeded. This led for pressure to support a new line from Burntisland to Newport-on-Tay and Tayport via Kinghorn, Kirkcaldy, Markinch and Cupar in 1840. However, it was three years before Parliament even acknowledged this essential plan. A unanimous decision was passed in favour by both the House of Lords and Commons. Kirkcaldy railway station, along with now defunct stations in Sinclairtown and Dysart, finally opened on 20 June 1847 as part of the Edinburgh and Northern Railway, which terminated at Cupar. Train services  were later taken over by the North British Railway, which was absorbed by the London and North Eastern Railway in 1923. The  nationalised British Railways took over in 1948.

Originally, only the south platform was covered, until a re-fit of the station was undertaken towards the end of the 19th century. In the late 19th and early 20th centuries, the station was surrounded by various Linoleum works, which had sidings allowing the product to be shipped via the main line. 

The station buildings survived intact until they were re-built in 1964, probably as part of the controversial town centre redevelopment plan. A fire in the late 1980s led to the destruction of the south platform. A new south platform had to be built again from scratch, and this was officially re-opened again to the public in 1991.

Services

Southbound
 2 trains per hour to Edinburgh Waverley Semi-fast 45-55 Mins
 1 train per day to Edinburgh Waverley calling at all stations
 1 train per day (except Saturdays) to London Euston (Caledonian Sleeper).
 1 train per hour to Edinburgh Waverley (Limited Stop) Evenings only

Limited Service to North Queensferry & Dalmeny

On Sundays, there are two semi-fast trains per hour to Edinburgh and one all-stations local service.

Northbound
 1 train per day to Glenrothes with Thornton (Peak Time)
 1 train per hour to Perth
 1 train per hour to Dundee
ScotRail Edinburgh to Aberdeen services do not usually stop at Kirkcaldy (except during the a.m peak and in the late evening).  4 London North Eastern Railway services call during the daytime. The Caledonian Sleeper also calls, but only to set down.

On Sundays, there are hourly services to Dundee and northbound along the Fife Circle, plus two-hourly services to Aberdeen

References

Notes

Sources 

 
 
 
 
 
 
 Station information from Fife Council

Railway stations in Fife
Former North British Railway stations
Railway stations in Great Britain opened in 1847
Railway stations served by ScotRail
Railway stations served by Caledonian Sleeper
Railway stations served by London North Eastern Railway
Railway station
1847 establishments in Scotland